Antico may refer to:

People
 Andrea Antico (  1480 – after 1538), Renaissance music printer active in Rome; Ottaviano Petrucci's first competitor
 Anthony Antico (born 1935), American mobster
 Antico Dalton (born 1975), American and Canadian football linebacker
 Tristan Antico (1923–2004), Australian industrialist
 Antico or "L'Antico", nickname of Renaissance sculptor Pier Jacopo Alari Bonacolsi (c. 1460–1528)

Other
 Antico Pizza, pizzeria in Atlanta, Georgia
 Feroleto Antico, town in Calabria
 Monte Antico, village in Tuscany
 Rosso Antico, aperitif
 Stile antico, the use of Renaissance polyphonic style after around 1600, used in distinction to the stile moderno

See also
 Futuro Antico (disambiguation)